Albert Louis Del Greco (born March 2, 1962) is a former American football placekicker and a current sports radio personality. After eight years as golf coach at Spain Park High School in Hoover, Alabama, Del Greco was named the head coach of the men's golf team at Samford University on May 2, 2014.

Biography
Del Greco finished his 17 NFL seasons with 347 of 449 (77%) field goals and 551 of 554 (99.46%) extra points, giving him a total of 1,592 points. As of 2018, he's ranked 21st on the NFL's list of all-time leading scorers. He was inducted in the Alabama Hall of Fame.  He was nicknamed "Automatic Al". For his popularity in fantasy football leagues, some fans consider him to be the greatest kicker in history.

A four-year letterman at Auburn, Del Greco completed 110 out of 111 PATs in his college career. He also set the SEC record for field goal attempts in a single game and field goals made in a single game in a 1982 game versus Kentucky where he made six out of his seven attempts. As of 2016, He and Daniel Carlson are tied for the most field goals in a single game for Auburn at 6. His 236 career points place him fifth on the Auburn career scoring list.

At Spain Park High School in Hoover, Alabama, Del Greco was the boys golf coach and the football team's kicking coach.  His son, Trey was the football team's place kicker prior to graduating after the 2007 season.  Trey went on to play golf on an athletic scholarship at Vanderbilt University. In 2003, Del Greco became Birmingham Steeldogs' kickers coach.

He co-hosted "The Opening Drive" on WJOX in Birmingham, Alabama with Jay Barker and Tony Kurre. The program ended in early 2018.

Del Greco was the starting placekicker in Super Bowl XXXIV for the Tennessee Titans, which his team lost 23–16. In the game, he made one field goal, which tied the game 16–16.

Career regular season statistics
Career high/best bolded

Titans franchise records
 Most all-time field goals made (246)
 Most all-time extra points made (322)
 Most all-time points scored (1,060)

Celebrity golf
Del Greco has competed at the American Century Championship, an annual competition to determine the best golfers among American sports and entertainment celebrities. He won the tournament in 1998 and has a total of ten top ten finishes. It was in 2000 when Del Greco’s 7 under par 65, gave him the 2000 trophy. The tournament, televised by NBC in July, is played at Edgewood Tahoe Golf Course in Lake Tahoe, Nevada. He also played with his new daughter in law Stephanie.

References

 Super Bowl XXXIV Rosters
 Super Bowl XXXIV#Scoring summary

External links
 Del Greco's stats
 NFL's all time leading scorers

1962 births
Living people
American football placekickers
Auburn Tigers football players
Green Bay Packers players
Arizona Cardinals players
Houston Oilers players
St. Louis Cardinals (football) players
Tennessee Oilers players
Tennessee Titans players
Players of American football from Providence, Rhode Island